This is a list of Danish television related events from 1976.

Events

Debuts

Television shows

Ending this year

Births
13 April - Uffe Holm, comedian & TV host
1 July - Andrea Elisabeth Rudolph, TV & radio host
8 August - Sisse Fisker, TV host
23 September - Shirley, singer & actress
12 October - Felix Smith, TV & radio host

Deaths

See also
1976 in Denmark